Bridge, or more formally contract bridge, is a trick-taking card game of skill and chance played by four players. This article consists of lists of bridge books deemed significant by various authors and organizations.

History
Books on bridge and its predecessor games have spanned centuries with the earliest known popular book on the subject of Whist having been published by Edmond Hoyle in 1742 or 1743.

The timelines in the evolutionary path to modern contract bridge books are generally as follows:
 17th century: the emergence of Whist from earlier games such as Ruff and Honours and Triumph
 18th and 19th centuries: Whist is widely played with many variants in scoring methods; similar games such as Vint and Khedive are also played
 1886: Evidence that Bridge-Whist has emerged with John Collinson's four page pamphlet entitled Biritch, or Russian Whist. (Earlier, in 1869, Christian Vanderheid, an Austrian writer about card games, published Gründlicher Selbstunterricht zur Erlernung des Jarolasch oder das russische Whist (Extensive Self-teaching of Yeralash (Jarolasch) or Russian Whist). The game described by Vanderheid is almost identical to Collinson's Biritch, with the exception that it is not played with a dummy.)
 1903–1932: from the first known publication on Auction Bridge (also known as Royal Auction Bridge and simply, Auction) to the last publication of Laws of Auction Bridge by the Portland Club
 c. 1915: Bridge Plafond emerges in France and Belgium and is essentially contract bridge without vulnerability
 late 1925: a significant new scoring system was proposed by Harold Vanderbilt introducing the concept of vulnerability, large bonuses for slams and heavy penalties for undertricks.  Within two years, "Auction was swept off the tables" in the dawn of modern contract bridge.
 1926–1935: numerous books on bidding are published and compete for status as the 'official system' of choice. Ely Culbertson rises to prominence in the US as a self-promoting bridge player, challenging his English and European counterparts to international matches all the while building a business empire based on his bridge writing and related investments.  In the early Thirties, Acol is fashioned by S. J. Simon and Jack Marx, and eventually becomes the most popular bidding system in Britain.
 1935: Culbertson publishes the first Encyclopedia of Bridge.

Precursor games
The following are books on the various precursor games to modern contract bridge; the first books on contract bridge appeared in 1927.
  86 pages. / London: Thomas Osborne, 10th Edition, 1750, 224 pages
 
 
 
  / 8th Edition, 1868, 120 pages; 9th Edition, 1872, 120 pages; 11th Edition, 1876, 268 pages; 12th Edition, 1879, 268 pages; 13th Edition, 1881, 268 pages; 15th Edition, 1885, 272 pages; 20th Edition, 1892, 303 pages; 21st Edition, 1893, 320 pages; 22nd Edition (The Seventy-fifth Thousand), 1895, 306 pages; 23rd Edition (The Eighty-sixth Thousand), 1898, 306 pages; 24th Edition (Containing the New Code of Laws Revised in 1900), 1901, 306 pages. American Editions published by: John Wurtele Lovell (New York), 1880 from the 12th English Edition, 257 pages; John Wurtele Lovell (New York), 1881 from the 12th English Edition, 257 pages; Charles Scribner's Sons, 1899 from the 23rd English Edition, 348 pages.
  / Second Edition, 1870 / First American Edition: Henry Holt and Company (New York), 1874, 153 pages. / New American edition from the second English Edition, 1880, 163 pages.
  Article on the evolution of Whist.
  / G.W. Carleton & Co. Publishers (London) 1879, 144 pages. / Longmans, Green, and Co. (London), 14th Edition, 1883, 112 pages. / G.W. Carleton & Co. Publishers (London) 1884, 114 pages. / Frederick A. Stokes (New York), 1887, 136 pages. / 1889, 128 pages.
 
 
  / Brentano's (New York, Chicago, Washington), 2nd Edition, 1891, 168 pages. Frederick Warne and Co. with Mudie and Sons, (London), 2nd Edition, 1891, 168 pages.  Brentano's (New York, Chicago, Washington), 3rd Edition with American Leads, 25th Thousand, 1896, 195 pages.  Frederick Warne and Co. with Mudie and Sons, (London), 4th Edition, 1899. Frederick Warne and Co. with Mudie and Sons, (London), 5th Edition, Thirty-fifth Thousand, 1900, 168 pages.
  / Brentano's (New York), 5th Edition, 1895, 109 pages
 
 
 
 
  / 1903, 136 pages / 1907, 136 pages / 1911, 136 pages.
  / 6th Edition, Charles Scribner's Sons (New York), 1907, 297 pages.

People and culture
The following books provide insights into the people and culture of contract bridge and while they may contain occasional references to certain technical aspects of the game, they are generally not instructional in theme. Fictional novels with a bridge theme are listed separately.
 
 
 
 
  / Prentice-Hall Inc. (Englewood Cliffs N. J.) 1965, 217 pages.
 
 
  / Simon and Schuster (New York), 191 pages.
  / Robert Hale (London), 1976, 221 pages, .
 
 The Bridge Bum by Alan Sontag, 1977
 
 
 
  / Granovetter Books (Ballston Lake, N.Y.), 1992, 252 pages,  / Netco Press (Little Falls, N.J.), 1994, 252 pages,  / Netco Press, (Little Falls, N.J.), 2003, 264 pages, 
 
 
 
 
 
 
 
 
 
 
Fictional novels

Encyclopedias, dictionaries and almanacs
The following are listed chronologically:
  32 pages.
  477 pages.
  252 pages.
  691 pages.
  674 pages.
  793 pages.
  858 pages.
  922 pages.
  277 pages.
  827 pages (plus 38 page Bibliography)
  826 pages (plus 60 page Bibliography)
  490 pages.
  536 pages.
  423 pages.
  634 pages (plus two CDs: 1. The Encyclopedia and 2. Biographies and Results).

Book of the Year Awards

American Bridge Teachers' Association (ABTA)
Each year since 1982, ABTA has recognized one or more books as contributing significantly to the teaching of contract bridge.  The following are the award recipients:
 1982 – 
 1983 – 
 1984 – 
 1985 – 
 1986 – 
 1987 – Commonsense Bidding by William S. Root
 1988 – 
 1989 – 
 1990 – 
 1991 – Basic Book: 
 1991 – Advanced Book: 
 1992 – 
 1992 – Advanced Book: To Bid or Not to Bid, The LAW of Total Tricks by Larry Cohen
 1993 – Basic Book: 
 1993 – Advanced Book: 
 1994 – 
 1995 – 
 1996 – Points Schmoints! Bergen's Winning Bridge Secrets by Marty Bergen
 1996 – 
 1997 –  Advanced Book: 
 1997 – Basic Book: 
 1998 – Beginner/Student Book: 
 1998 –  Advanced Book: 
 1999 –  Basic Book: 
 1999 –  Advanced Book: 
 1999 – Student Book: 25 Bridge Conventions You Should Know by Barbara Seagram and Marc Smith
 2000 –   Advanced Book: 
 2000 –  Beginner/Intermediate Book: 
 2001 – 
 2002 – 
 2003 –  Beginner/Novice Book: 
 2003 –  Intermediate/Advanced Book: 
 2004 – 
 2005 – 
 2006 – 
 2007 – Beginner Book: 
 2007 – Intermediate Book: 
 2008 – Intermediate Book: 
 2008 – Novice Book: 
 2009 –  / 176p.
 2010 – Beginner Book:  / 231p.
 2010 – Intermediate Book:  / 160 pages.
 2011 – 
 2012 – Beginner/Intermediate: 
 2012 – Intermediate/Advanced: 
 2013 – Intermediate/Advanced Book: 
 2013 – Beginner Book: 
 2014 – Beginner: 
 2014 – Intermediate/Advanced: 
 2015 – Intermediate/Advanced: 
 2015 – Beginner/Intermediate: 
 2016 – Beginner/Intermediate: 
 2017 – Beginner/Intermediate:  
 2017 – Intermediate/Advanced:  
 2018 – Newcomer: 
 2018 – Beginner/Novice: 
 2018 – Intermediate/Advanced: 
 2019 – Beginner: 
 2019 – Intermediate: 
 2019 – Advanced:  
 2020 – Beginner/Novice:  
 2020 – Intermediate/Advanced:  
 2020 – Advanced: 
 2021 – Beginner/Novice: 
 2021 – Intermediate: 
 2021 – Advanced:

International Bridge Press Association (IBPA)
Annually since 2004, the IBPA has chosen one bridge-related title of exceptional merit as follows:

 2004 – 
 2005 – 
 2006 – 
 2007 – 
 2008 – 
 2009 – 
 2009 – 
 2010 – 
 2011 – 
 2012 – 
 2013 – 
 2014 – , 386 pages
 2015 – 
 2016 – 
 2017 – 
 2018 – 
 2019 -  240 pages.

American Contract Bridge League (ACBL) surveys
The ACBL has conducted the following surveys:

1994 survey
The ACBL survey of 1994 was a poll of well-known players and writers only and resulted in the following list of the 20 best books of all time:

 Why You Lose at Bridge by S. J. Simon
 Killing Defence at Bridge by Hugh Kelsey
 Right Through the Pack by Robert Darvas and Norman de V. Hart
 Reese on Play: An Introduction to Good Play by Terence Reese
 Bridge in the Menagerie by Victor Mollo
 To Bid or Not to Bid by Larry N. Cohen
 Adventures in Card Play by Géza Ottlik and Hugh Kelsey
 The Expert Game by Terence Reese
 Defensive Bridge Play Complete by Eddie Kantar
 Play Bridge with Reese by Terence Reese
 How to Read Your Opponents Cards by Mike Lawrence
 Card Play Technique or the Art of Being Lucky by Victor Mollo and Nico Gardener
 Five Weeks to Winning Bridge by Alfred Sheinwold
 Bid Better, Play Better by Dorothy Hayden
 Bridge Squeezes Complete by Clyde E. Love
 Matchpoints by Kit Woolsey
 Bridge With the Blue Team by Pietro Forquet
 The Official Encyclopedia of Bridge by Henry Francis et al.
 All 52 Cards by Marshall Miles
 Watson on the Play of the Hand at Contract Bridge by Louis H. Watson

2007 survey
The ACBL survey of 2007 resulted in two lists of favourite books as follows:

Top 10 books as rated by Experts – in descending order
 The Expert Game by Terence Reese
 Why You Lose at Bridge by S. J. Simon
 Adventures in Card Play by Géza Ottlik and Hugh Kelsey
 Killing Defence at Bridge by Hugh Kelsey
 Bridge in the Menagerie by Victor Mollo
 Right Through the Pack by Robert Darvas and Norman de V. Hart
 Watson on the Play of the Hand at Contract Bridge by Louis H. Watson
 Card Play Technique or the Art of Being Lucky by Victor Mollo and Nico Gardener
 Bridge With the Blue Team by Pietro Forquet
 Reese on Play: An Introduction to Good Play by Terence Reese
Top 10 books as rated by Other Readers – in descending order
 Watson on the Play of the Hand at Contract Bridge by Louis H. Watson
 Points Schmoints! Bergen's Winning Bridge Secrets by Marty Bergen
 How to Read Your Opponents Cards by Mike Lawrence
 Why You Lose at Bridge by S. J. Simon
 Killing Defence at Bridge by Hugh Kelsey
 25 Bridge Conventions You Should Know by Barbara Seagram and Marc Smith
 Card Play Technique or the Art of Being Lucky by Victor Mollo and Nico Gardener
 Adventures in Card Play by Géza Ottlik and Hugh Kelsey
 Standard Bridge Bidding for the 21st Century by Max Hardy
 The Secrets of Winning Bridge by Jeff Rubens

The Official Encyclopedia of Bridge (7th edition) recommendations
The 7th edition of the Encyclopedia recommended the following books with the caveat that the "list on this page is by no means definitive. It was influenced to a degree by surveys published in 1994 and 2007 in the Bridge Bulletin", published by the American Contract Bridge League. Listed alphabetically by first author surname.

Points Schmoints! Bergen's Winning Bridge Secrets by Marty Bergen
Declarer Play the Bergen Way by Marty Bergen
52 Great Tips on Declarer Play by David Bird
Another 52 Great Bridge Tips by David Bird
Matchpoints Versus IMPs by August Boehm
To Bid or Not to Bid: The Law of Total Tricks by Larry N. Cohen 
Right Through the Pack by Robert Darvas and Norman de V. Hart 
Bridge with the Blue Team by Pietro Forquet 
Commonly Used Conventions in the 21st Century by Audrey Grant 
How the Experts Win at Bridge by Burt and Rose Hall
Two Over One Game Force (Revised and Expanded) by Max Hardy 
The Mysterious Multi by Mark Horton and Jan van Cleeff 
Canada's Bridge Warriors: Eric Murray and Sami Kehela by Roy Hughes
Roman Keycard Blackwood: The Final Word by Eddie Kantar
Take All Your Tricks by Eddie Kantar
Modern Bridge Defense by Eddie Kantar
Advanced Bridge Defense by Eddie Kantar
Test Your Play II by Eddie Kantar
Topics in Declarer Play by Eddie Kantar
Killing Defense at Bridge by Hugh Kelsey
Adventures in Card Play by Hugh Kelsey with Géza Ottlik
Guide to Better Duplicate Bridge by Ron Klinger
Modern Losing Trick Count by Ron Klinger
A Bridge to Simple Squeezes by Julian Laderman
A Bridge to Inspired Declarer Play by Julian Laderman 
How to Read Your Opponents' Cards by Mike Lawrence
Judgment at Bridge by Mike Lawrence
The Complete Book on Balancing by Mike Lawrence
The Complete Book of Overcalls by Mike Lawrence
Play Bridge with Mike Lawrence by Mike Lawrence 
Bridge Squeezes Complete by Clyde E. Love
Winning Endplay Strategy by Clyde Love
All 52 Cards by Marshall Miles 
Bridge in the Menagerie by Victor Mollo
Card Play Technique by Victor Mollo and Nico Gardener
The Devil's Ticket: A Night of Bridge, a Fatal Hand and a New American Age by Gary Pomerantz 
A Great Deal of Bridge Problems by Julian Pottage
Thinking on Defense by Jim Priebe 
Reese on Play by Terence Reese
Master Play by Terence Reese
Play These Hands with Me  by Terence Reese
The Expert Game by Terence Reese 
The Rodwell Files by Eric Rodwell and Mark Horton 
Commonsense Bidding by William Root 
The Secrets of Winning Bridge by Jeff Rubens 
5 Weeks to Winning Bridge by Alfred Sheinwold
Why You Lose at Bridge by S. J. Simon
Frank Stewart's Bridge Club by Frank Stewart 
The Great Bridge Scandal by Alan Truscott 
Watson's Play of the Hand at Bridge by Louis Watson 
The Lone Wolff by Bobby Wolff 
Matchpoints by Kit Woolsey

Mark Horton's recommendations
In his 1999 book, The Mammoth Book of Bridge, Mark Horton lists his recommendations for "Bridge Books You Should Read", grouped as follows:

Classics

General
 Five Weeks to Winning Bridge by Alfred Sheinwold
 Bid Better, Play Better by Dorothy Hayden
 Matchpoints by Kit Woolsey

Bidding
 Commonsense Bidding by William S. Root
 To Bid or Not to Bid, The Law of Total Tricks by Larry N. Cohen
 Bridge Conventions Complete by Amalya Kearse
 The Complete Book of Hand Evaluation by Mike Lawrence
 The Complete Book of Overcalls by Mike Lawrence

Declarer Play
 Watson on the Play of the Hand at Contract Bridge by Louis H. Watson
 How to Read Your Opponents Cards by Mike Lawrence
 Card Play Technique or the Art of Being Lucky by Victor Mollo and Nico Gardener
 Reese on Play: An Introduction to Good Play by Terence Reese
 The Expert Game by Terence Reese
 Play these Hands with Me by Terence Reese
 Bridge Squeezes Complete by Clyde E. Love
 The Dictionary of Suit Combinations by Jean-Marc Roudinescu
 Adventures in Card Play by Géza Ottlik and Hugh Kelsey

Defender's Play
 Killing Defence at Bridge by Hugh Kelsey
 Opening Leads by Robert Ewen

Entertainment
 Why You Lose at Bridge by S. J. Simon
 Right Through the Pack by Robert Darvas and Norman de V. Hart
 Bridge Humor by Eddie Kantar
 The Best of Eddie Kantar: Funny Stories from the Bridge Table by Eddie Kantar
 Bridge in the Menagerie by Victor Mollo
 Miracles of Card Play by David Bird and Terence Reese
 Bridge with the Blue Team by Pietro Forquet
 The Bridge Bum by Alan Sontag

For beginners

General
 Bridge for Dummies by Eddie Kantar
 Win at Bridge in 30 Days by David Bird
 Bridge for Bright Beginners by Terence Reese
 Bridge Basics by Ron Klinger
 Teach Me to Play – A First Book of Bridge by Jude Goodwin and Don Ellison
 Bridge for Beginners by Audrey Grant and Zia Mahmood
 Bridge for Beginners by Nico Gardener and Victor Mollo
 Beginning Bridge by Alan Hiron and Maureen Hiron

Bidding
 Teach Yourself Basic Bidding by Alan Truscott and Dorothy Hayden
 Basic Acol by Ben Cohen and Rhoda Barrow
 Really Easy Bidding by the English Bridge Union Teachers' Association (EBUTA)

Declarer Play
 Introduction to Declarer's Play by Eddie Kantar

Defender's Play
 Introduction to Defender's Play by Eddie Kantar

For advancing players

General
 Winning Contract Bridge Complete by Edgar Kaplan
 The Complete Book of Bridge by Terence Reese and Albert Dormer
 The Mistakes You Make at Bridge by Terence Reese and Roger Trézel

Bidding
 Points Schmoints! Bergen's Winning Bridge Secrets by Marty Bergen
 25 Bridge Conventions You Should Know by Barbara Seagram and Marc Smith
 Modern Bridge Conventions by Bill Root and Richard Pavlicek
 Judgement in Bridge by Mike Lawrence
 Hand Evaluation in Bridge by Brian Senior
 Preempts from A-Z by Ron Andersen and Sabine Zenkel
 Raising Partner by Brian Senior
 Precision Bidding in Acol by Eric Crowhurst
 Acol in Competition by Eric Crowhurst
 Washington Standard by Steve Robinson

Declarer Play
 Countdown to Winning Bridge by Tim Bourke and Marc Smith
 The Basic Elements of Play and Defence by G. C. H. Fox
 Play of the Hand Complete by Eddie Kantar
 Guide to Better Card Play by Ron Klinger

Defender's Play
 Kantar for the Defense, Volume 1 by Eddie Kantar
 Kantar for the Defense, Volume 2 by Eddie Kantar
 Opening Leads by Mike Lawrence
 Step-by-Step Signalling by Mark Horton
 Eddie Kantar Teaches Advanced Bridge Defense by Eddie Kantar

For experienced players

General
 The Complete Book of BOLS Tips by Sally Brock
 The Secrets of Winning Bridge by Jeff Rubens
 For Experts Only by Matthew Granovetter
 Matchpoint Bridge by Hugh Kelsey
 Hoffman on Pairs Play by Martin Hoffman
 Expert Tuition for Tournament Players by Raymond Brock and Sally Brock

Bidding
 Partnership Bidding by Andrew Robson and Oliver Segal
 The Modern Losing Trick Count by Ron Klinger
 Better Bridge with Bergen, Volumes 1 & 2 by Marty Bergen
 Precision and Super Precision Bidding by Giorgio Belladonna and Benito Garozzo
 Powerhouse Hands by Albert Dormer
 Aces Scientific by Bobby Goldman

Declarer Play
 Step-by-Step: Deceptive Declarer Play by Barry Rigal
 Advanced Play at Bridge by Hugh Kelsey
 Secrets of Expert Card Play by David Bird and Tony Forrester
 Simple Squeezes by Hugh Kelsey
 Positive Declarer's Play by Terence Reese and Julian Pottage
 Bridge: Tricks of the Trade by Terence Reese and David Bird

Defender's Play
 Dynamic Defense by Mike Lawrence
 Secrets of Expert Defence by David Bird and Tony Forrester
 Step-by-Step: Deception in Defence by Barry Rigal
 Partnership Defense in Bridge by Kit Woolsey
 Positive Defence by Terence Reese and Julian Pottage

British Bridge Almanack survey
The British Bridge Almanack reported on a survey of leading British bridge personalities. The survey presented a chronological list of 16 books by British authors deemed to have made a significant contribution to the development of the game. It asked the personalities to add as many as three titles of their choosing and then to identify their top five. Of the 24 reported respondents, 19 identified one or more titles.

Initial list 
 Lederer Bids Two Clubs by Richard Lederer, 1934
 The Acol System of Contract Bridge by Ben Cohen and Terence Reese, 1938
 Why You Lose at Bridge by S. J. Simon, 1945
 Reese on Play by Terence Reese, 1947
 Card Play Technique by Victor Mollo and Nico Gardener, 1955
 The Theory of Bidding by Norman Squire, 1957
 Winning Points at Match-Point Bridge by Norman Squire and Maurice Harrison-Gray, 1959
 Play Bridge with Reese by Terence Reese, 1960
 The Expert Game by Terence Reese, 1960
 The Acol System Today by Terence Reese and Albert Dormer, 1961
 Develop Your Bidding Judgement by Terence Reese, 1962
 Killing Defence at Bridge by Hugh Kelsey, 1966
 The Play of the Cards by Terence Reese and Albert Dormer, 1967
 Advanced Play at Bridge by Hugh Kelsey, 1968
 Hoffman on Pairs Play by Martin Hoffman, 1982
 Partnership Bidding at Bridge by Andrew Robson and Oliver Segal, 1993

Added titles
These additional titles were nominated by respondents.
 Bridge is an Easy Game by Iain Macleod, 1952
 Country Life Book of Bridge by Maurice Harrison-Gray, 1972
 Adventures in Card-Play by Géza Ottlik and Hugh Kelsey, 1979 
 The Bidding Dictionary by Alan Truscott, 1996
 The Big Game: Rubber Bridge in a London club by Richard Sheehan, 1999

Most mentioned 
These were the leaders by number of selections (as many as five per respondent).
 17 mentions: The Expert Game by Terence Reese, 1960
 14 mentions: Why You Lose at Bridge by S. J. Simon, 1945
 12 mentions: Killing Defence at Bridge by Hugh Kelsey, 1966
 11 mentions:  Reese on Play by Terence Reese, 1947
 8 mentions:  Play Bridge with Reese by Terence Reese, 1960
 7 mentions: Card Play Technique by Victor Mollo and Nico Gardener, 1955
No other title received more than three mentions.

Biographies
  314 pages.
  256 pages.
  240 pages.
  287 pages.

Bibliographies

Encyclopedic bibliographies 
Several encyclopedias on the subject of bridge have provided bibliographies of bridge related publications.

The Encyclopedia of Bridge

The Encyclopedia of Bridge of 1935 acknowledges certain authors' publications in their brief biographies but no summary tabulation or categorization of bridge literature or evaluative commentary is provided.

The Official Encyclopedia of Bridge

The Official Encyclopedia of Bridge (OEB) is a publication of the American Contract Bridge League first published in 1964 with the 7th edition published in 2011. Up to the 6th, each OEB edition contains a bibliography of bridge related publications grouped by subject (history, bidding, play, reference, etc.) and rates selected publications as:
(a) having made a significant contribution to the technical development of the game;
(b) being mandatory for inclusion in a modern technical library;
(c) being optional for inclusion in a modern technical library; or (d) none of the foregoing. Subject categories and ratings for a publication may vary between editions of the OEB.  The 1st edition bibliography spans 8 pages and lists about 400 titles; the 6th edition bibliography, prepared by Tim Bourke, spans 60 pages and lists approximately 4,100 titles;
Up to the 6th, each edition of The Official Encyclopedia of Bridge contains a bibliography of bridge and bridge related books; the following is a summary of their contents.

The Bridge Players' Encyclopedia

The Bridge Players Encyclopedia (BPE) was published in 1967 by Paul Hamlyn (London) and is an International Edition based on The Official Encyclopedia of Bridge of 1964 but geared to the needs of British and European players. The edition modified American spellings, "translated" bidding structures to the more widely used Acol system, omitted biographical notes on some lesser known Americans and added biographical notes on some British and European players. Although content differs from the 1964 OEB, the publication contains a 9-page bibliography of approximately 500 titles with subject categorization and rating schemes similar to those of the previous OEB editions.

Bibliographies in Wikipedia articles

By subject

 Bridge conventions
 Hand evaluation
 Losing-Trick Count
 Odds, Probabilities
 Opening leads
 Preemptive bidding
 Signalling
 Squeeze plays
 Suit combinations

By author

 Pierre Albarran
 Tim Bourke
 John Brown
 Michelle Brunner
 Walter Buller
 Ben Cohen
 Larry Cohen
 Ely Culbertson
 Joseph Elwell
 Jeremy Flint
 Robert Frederick Foster
 Charles Goren
 Mark Horton
 Oswald Jacoby
 Eddie Kantar
 Hugh Kelsey
 Ron Klinger
 Harry Lampert
 Michael Lawrence
 Rixi Markus
 Jeff Meckstroth
 Marshall Miles
 Victor Mollo
 Hubert Phillips
 Julian Pottage
 Terence Reese
 Andrew Robson
 Eric Rodwell
 William S. (Bill) Root
 George Rosenkranz
 Barbara Seagram
 S. J. Simon
 Marc Smith
 Paul Stern
 Alan Truscott
 Louis H. Watson
 Kit Woolsey

Other bibliographies

Bibliography
Following are details about books referenced in preceding sections, listed by first named author's surname beginning with: A B C D E F G H I J K L M N O P Q R S T U V W X Y Z

- A -
  290 pages.

- B -

- C -
 
  674 pages.
 
  286 pages.
 
  240 pages. (1983) London: Pelham. . 256 pages.
  383 pages.
  157 pages.

- D -

- E -
 
  226 pages.
  162 pages. Also: (1976) London: Robert Hale Books. . 162 pages.

- F -
  Revised 1973, further revised 1991.

- G -
 
 
 
  / 190 pages.

- H -
 
 
 
 
  (1966-1986). First edition 1966: Harper & Row (New York), 196p. / 1966: Award Books (New York), 254p. / 1967: Universal (New York), 254p. / 1967: Award Books (New York), Tandem (London), 254p. / 1970: Award Books (New York), Tandem (London), 254p. / 1981: Pinnacle Books (New York), 235p. / 1986: Perennial Library (New York), 235p.

- I -

- J -

- K -
 Kantar, Eddie (Edwin): For a complete listing of Eddie Kantar books, see Edwin Kantar bibliography.
  108 pages.
  Wilshire Book Company (North Hollywood, CA), 142p.,  / Prentice Hall (Endlewood Cliffs, NJ), 147p. / Muller (London), 1971, 147p
  Wilshire Book Company (North Hollywood, CA), 153p. / Prentice Hall (Endlewood Cliffs, NJ), 153p. / Muller (London), 1971, 153p / Wilshire Book Company (North Hollywood, CA), 1977, 153p
 
  151 pages.
  200 pages.
  200 pages.
  214 pages.
  IDG Books Worldwide (Foster City, CA), 1997, 382p. / Second Edition: Wiley Publishing Inc., (Hoboken, NJ), 2006, 388p.  / Large Print Edition: Thorndike Press (Waterville, Me), 2008, 563p
  240 pages.
 
  1121 pages.
  191 pages.
  192 pages.
  120 pages.
 
   217 pages.
   146 pages.
 
 
 
  — (2009) The Modern Losing Trick Count: Bidding to Win at Contract Bridge (13th impression). London: by Cassell in association with Peter Crawley, pp. 143. .

- L -
 
 
 
 
 
 
 
 
 
  423 pages.

- M -
 
  59 pages.
 
 
 
 
 
  381 pages.
 
  143 pages.

- N -

- O -
  Also,

- P -

- Q -

- R -
 Reese, Terence: For a complete listing of Terence Reese books, see Terence Reese bibliography.
  151 pages. / Dover Publications (New York), 151 pages. / Oak Tree Press (London), 151 pages. / Oak Tree Press (London), 1965, 151 pages. / Cornerstone Library (New York), 1968 and 1969, 144 pages. / Dover Publications (New York), 1973, 151 pages.
  144 pages. / 1991, 144 pages.
  485 pages. (1985), Faber, 469 pages.
  , 128 pages.
  , 128 pages. / Master Point Press (Toronto) 2005, 160 pages.
  1989, 168 pages. / Reprint: Houghton Mifflin (Boston) in association with Peter Crawley, 1992,  / New Edition: Gollancz (London), 1994, 168 pages. / Revised Edition by Ron Klinger: Cassell (London) in association with Peter Crawley, 2006, 160 pages.
 
 
  300 pages.
 
  244 pages; Three Rivers Press (New York), 244 pages; 1992, Crown Publishers Inc., Crown Trade Paperbacks (New York), 244 pages.
   (hardcover),  (softcover), 216 pages; 1995, Three Rivers Press (New York), 216 pages.
 
 
   (hardcover),  (softcover)

- S -
 , 
 
  140 pages; London: Batsford. . 127 pages.
 
 
  (1960-1987). First copyright 1959. / First printing 1960: Pocket Books (New York), Permabook M7514, 548 pages. / 1960: Pocket Books (New York), 548 pages,  / 1960: Pocket Books (New York), Permabook M5015 / 1962: Trident Press, Simon & Schuster (New York), 528 pages. / 1964: Pocket Books (New York), 549 pages. / 1964: Revised and enlarged, Trident Press, Simon & Schuster (New York), 548 pages. / 1973: Pocket Books (New York), 547 pages. / 1975: Pocket Books (New York), 547 pages. / 1987: Pocket Books (New York). 548 pages,

- T -

- U -

- V -

- W -
  — (1958) Enlarged and modernized by Sam Fry, Jr.
  162 pages.
  287 pages.
  — (reprinted 1988 and 1992) Louisville, KY: Devyn Press Inc., pp. 343, OCLC 477153995.
  — (reprinted 1991), pp. 303, .
  — (reprinted 1992) Louisville, KY: Devyn Press Inc., pp. 64, .

- X -

- Y -

- Z -

See also

Lists
 List of bridge competitions and awards
 List of contract bridge magazines
 List of contract bridge people

Books
25 Bridge Conventions You Should Know
Bridge Squeezes Complete
The Cardturner
Contract Bridge for Beginners
Planning the Play of a Bridge Hand
The Official Encyclopedia of Bridge

References

External links
 The Bridge World recommended books for beginners
 The Bridge World recommended books for intermediates
 The Bridge World recommended books for advanced players
 The Bridge Library

 
Bridge